The Great Southern Railways (GSR) Class 700 consisted of five 0-6-0 locomotives built by Inchicore railway works in 1929 and were the last locomotives designed by J. R. Bazin. The Class 710 consisted of ten 0-6-0 locomotives built by Inchicore railway works in 1934.

History

Class 700
The design was more traditional with a saturated Belpaire boiler that was unique to the 700 class. It was also fitted with slide valves as opposed to piston valves.  The tenders used initially were those reallocated from withdrawn 360 class 4-6-0.  A more modern feature was underslung springs.

Operationally the need for the class has subsequently been questioned and speculation has arisen that it was to use up surplus type 60 boilers.
This class seems to have compared poorly with the older 101 Class when especially when the latter were fitted with superheated boilers, possibly due to an inadequate heating surface leading to high coal and water consumption.

Class 710
They were more modern than the five Class 700 0-6-0 introduced in 1929 though being more modern with piston valves and a type Z superheatered boiler. They could be thought of as a tender version of the GSR Class 670 0-6-2T introduced in 1933 but with smaller wheels more suited to branch and goods work.  Whilst intended as a modern addition to the 101 class they seemed to gain a reputation as poor steamers and heavy on coal and water.  Following their introduction the GSR resumed rebuilding the 101 class with the Z-type superheated boiler

Model
There is a detailed O Gauge model of engine 710 in the Fry model railway collection.

References

Footnotes

Sources
 
  
 

0-6-0 locomotives
5 ft 3 in gauge locomotives
Railway locomotives introduced in 1929
Scrapped locomotives
Steam locomotives of Ireland